In Jesus is the eighth studio album from Phatfish, released 4 June 2009. The album has been described by Cross Rhythms Christian magazine and radio as having "a slightly rockier edge than recent albums" that sees them "closer to the classic sound of their best selling albums Heavenbound and Nothing But The Truth whilst still maintaining the beautiful worship feel that pervades their music".

This album was the first since the addition of two new guitarists, Jos Wintermeyer and Ben Hall to the lineup in early 2009, and featured 10 entirely new songs. Ben and Jos both contribute to two songs each on the album, working with Lou and Nathan Fellingham respectively.

The band describe the album as "pumping" and "rhythmic" with soaring vocals from Lou Fellingham alongside sensitive and biblical lyrics.

The album reached number 3 on the Cross Rhythms sales charts, and Guaranteed climbed to 19 in the charts the same month.

Live

The release of the album was followed up with a tour starting at the Sound nightclub in London, leading onto Brighton, Woodbridge, Peterborough, Bromley and Norwich. The live shows feature songs from both 'In Jesus' and the back catalogue.

As well as playing gigs, the band lead worship at various events throughout the year, including Newday, Together on a Mission, Salt and Light Conference, New Word Alive and Keswick Convention, amongst others.

Release

The title track "In Jesus" was offered as a single free download from Wednesday 20 March 2009, available through the band's website. It was also advertised on Phatfish's official MySpace and Twitter. The song is the first from the album to be released. Within eight days of release the single was downloaded over 800 times from the Phatfish website before it ended on the 1 June.

The album was released on 4 June 2009. It became available on iTunes the same day, and a special edition "Phat Pack", including acoustic versions of three songs, sheet music and backing tracks, was made available alongside a "Phat Pack Plus" with the opportunity to own a special edition A2 poster and one of 5 different t-shirt designs on top of the standard contents.

Track listing

 "In Jesus"
 "To The Praise of Your Glory"
 "Come To Jesus"
 "Mission"
 "If I Have Not Love"
 "Pardoned"
 "No One Like Our God"
 "There Is Mercy"
 "God You Are My God"
 "He Watches Over Me"

Personnel

Phatfish
Lou Fellingham – vocals
Nathan Fellingham – drums
Luke Fellingham - bass guitar, engineering
Michael Sandeman - keyboards
Jos Wintermeyer - guitars
Ben Hall - guitars
Additional personnel
Julian Kindred - engineering
Kevan Frost - engineering, production, additional percussion, vocals and guitars on "Mission" and "Pardoned"
Mark Frost - programming on "He Watches Over Me"

References 

2009 albums
Phatfish albums